Marko Ognjanovski (born 14 June 1997) is a Macedonian handball player who plays for RK Tineks Prolet.

References
 http://www.eurohandball.com/ec/chc/men/2015-16/player/565519/MarkoOgnjanovski
 https://web.archive.org/web/20151226140037/http://ekipa.mk/tineks-prolet-potpisha-profesionalni-dogovori-so-chetvoritsa-mladi-rakometari/

1997 births
Living people
Macedonian male handball players
Sportspeople from Skopje